William Almon may refer to:

 William Bruce Almon (1787–1840), doctor and politician in Halifax, Nova Scotia
 William James Almon (1755–1817), doctor and loyalist, father of William Bruce Almon
 William Johnston Almon (1816–1901), Nova Scotian physician and Canadian politician, son of William Bruce Almon
 Bill Almon (born 1952), American baseball infielder